Mottron is a surname. Notable people with the surname include:

Laurent Mottron (born 1952), Canadian psychiatrist
Pierre Mottron (born 1987), French singer and songwriter

See also
Mothron